Tabernaemontana lorifera is a species of plant in the family Apocynaceae. It is found in northern Brazil, Guyana, and Suriname.

References

lorifera